Pediasia alaica is a moth in the family Crambidae. It was described by Hans Rebel in 1907. It is found in Central Asia, where it has been recorded from the Alai Mountains, the Pamir Mountains, the Tien-Shan Mountains and eastern Turkmenistan.

References

Crambini
Moths described in 1907
Moths of Asia